Ewing/Carroll is a neighborhood located within the city of Trenton in Mercer County, New Jersey, United States. It is considered to be an enclave within the larger Coalport/North Clinton neighborhood.

References

Neighborhoods in Trenton, New Jersey